Rosmo, founded as Carrocerías ROSMO by Mr. Severino Rosmo Baratto in 1936, is a Quetzaltenango, Guatemala-based bus manufacturer for the Guatemalan market.

External links
 Rosmo Homepage (in Spanish)

Bus manufacturers of Guatemala